The Wolves Amsterdam was a basketball club from Amsterdam which played from 1957 to 1968 in the Eredivisie. The club also came four seasons in the European competitions.

The club won its first Dutch championship basketball in 1957. From then it won the league title four more times. The Wolves Amsterdam is one of the 22 basketball clubs that participated in first edition of FIBA European Champions Cup in 1958.

Honours 

Dutch League
 Winners (5): 1956-57, 1959–60, 1960–61, 1963–64, 1964–65

In Europe 
Match table

Notable players 
  Ton Boot (1961–65)

References 

Defunct basketball teams in the Netherlands
Former Dutch Basketball League teams
Sports clubs in Amsterdam